Agdistis africana is a moth in the family Pterophoridae. It is known from South Africa. This species is known only from the type locality, the Tsitsikamma Coastal National Park.

References

Endemic moths of South Africa
Agdistinae
Moths of Africa
Plume moths of Africa
Moths described in 1996